Mo, Ni, Que is a public art work by Swiss artist Samuel Buri located at the Lynden Sculpture Garden near Milwaukee, Wisconsin. The fiberglass sculpture consists of three colorful cows that appear to graze; it is installed on the lawn. The title of the sculpture is derived from the name of its original owner, Monique Barbier. Mo, Ni, Que was exhibited at the Kunsthalle, Basel, Switzerland from January 22 to February 20, 1977, as part of a three-man show featuring Samuel Buri, William Phillips and Hans Remond.

References

 Catalog, "Samuel Buri, William Phillips, Hans Remond" at Kunsthalle Basel, 22. January - 20. February 1977. Kunsthalle Basel. Basel, Switzerland.

1975 sculptures
Outdoor sculptures in Milwaukee
Sculptures in Wisconsin
Cattle in art
Fiberglass sculptures in Wisconsin
1975 establishments in Wisconsin